Petit-Canal is a commune in the department of Guadeloupe. Petit-Canal is a coastal commune on Grande-Terre.

Population

Education
Public preschools and primary schools include:
 Ecole primaire Albertine Borel
 Ecole primaire Félicité Coline
 Ecole primaire Alice Delacroix
 Ecole primaire Sainte Geneviève
 Ecole maternelle Amédée Fengarol

Public junior high schools include:
 Collège Maximilien Vrecord

See also
Communes of the Guadeloupe department

References

Communes of Guadeloupe